Oecomys paricola, also known as the Brazilian oecomys, Brazilian arboreal rice rat, or South Amazonian arboreal rice rat, is a species of rodent in the genus Oecomys of family Cricetidae. It is found in central Brazil south of the Amazon, where it lives in lowland tropical rainforest.

References

Literature cited
Duff, A. and Lawson, A. 2004. Mammals of the World: A checklist. New Haven: A & C Black. 
Musser, G.G. and Carleton, M.D. 2005. Superfamily Muroidea. Pp. 894–1531 in Wilson, D.E. and Reeder, D.M. (eds.). Mammal Species of the World: a taxonomic and geographic reference. 3rd ed. Baltimore: The Johns Hopkins University Press, 2 vols., 2142 pp. 
Percequillo, A., Bonvicino, C., Weksler, M., Costa, L. and Catzeflis, F. 2008. . In IUCN. IUCN Red List of Threatened Species. Version 2009.2. <www.iucnredlist.org>. Downloaded on November 30, 2009.

Oecomys
Mammals described in 1904
Mammals of Brazil
Rodents of South America
Taxa named by Oldfield Thomas